Lawrence Ambrose Hayter (1893 – 30 December 1917) was an artist and significant contributor to The Children's Realm, a children's magazine about vegetarianism published, from 1906 to 1914, by the Vegetarian Federal Union and London Vegetarian Society. He was killed in action during the First World War.

Biography 

Hayter was born in 1893, in Upper Holloway, London, to Arthur William Hayter (an organ builder) and his wife Edith Rose. At school he was friends with Gerald Bullett and was known for publishing a jellygraphed school magazine, which he edited and illustrated with cartoons. Hayter lived in Letchworth, where he worked as a draughtsman. He was engaged to Gladys Cawston, who was a musician.

From 1908, Hayter was the main illustrator of the magazine The Children's Realm; his first illustration for it appeared at Christmas in 1908. As well as drawings, Hayter also contributed a large number of articles and stories, some of which he co-wrote with Bullett and provided the illustrations and cartoons. In 1912, Bullett published an article in which he praised Hayter's artistic talent, describing him as a "born artist". The Children's Realm ceased publication in 1914. In the same year, George Bedborough who had been editor of The Children's Realm, published a children's story book with anti-vivisection, animal rights and vegetarian themes, containing several illustrations by Hayter.

During the war, Hayter was originally a conscientious objector, but changed his mind and enlisted at Bedford; he was a private in the Bedfordshire Regiment, 6th Battalion. In the summer of 1917, he was buried by a shell and mistakenly presumed dead.

Hayter was killed in action by a shell on 30 December 1917, near Hollebeke, Belgium; he was buried at Klein Vierstraat British Cemetery, Plot I. Row H. Grave 8. His name is recorded on the Letchworth Cross memorial.

References 

1893 births
1917 deaths
Artists from London
Bedfordshire and Hertfordshire Regiment soldiers
British Army personnel of World War I
British military personnel killed in World War I
British vegetarianism activists
Burials in Commonwealth War Graves Commission cemeteries in Belgium
English cartoonists
English children's writers
English conscientious objectors
English illustrators
Military personnel from London